Miss Europe 1934 was the seventh annual Miss Europe and the sixth edition under French journalist Maurice de Waleffe. New delegates from the Atlantic, Finland, and Siberia and withdraws from Scotland, Turkey, Yugoslavia.

Before the contest, the representatives from Germany, Russia & Siberia were denounced by the ambassadors of the Soviet Union and the German Reich to the UK as not being true woman of those countries.

Results

Placements

Delegates
 – Louise Lyman
 – José Mandelaers
 – Ethel Louis
 – June Lammas
 – Ester Toivonen
 – Simone Barillier
 – Maria Magdalena Kant
 – Sonja Coers
 – Renée Gosztony
 – Tosca Giusti
 – Elsa Lindseth
 – Maria Zabkiewicz
 – Hélène Dona
 (In exile) – Yekaterina Antonova
 (In exile) – Nadezhda Fomenko
 – María Eugenia Henríquez Girón

References

External links

1934 in England
Miss Europe